The 2013 Albany Great Danes football team represented the University at Albany, SUNY in the 2013 NCAA Division I FCS football season. They were led by Bob Ford, who was in his 41st and final season as head coach, and played their first season at the new Bob Ford Field, named after the coach. The Great Danes were in their first season as a member of the Colonial Athletic Association. They finished the season 1–11, 0–8 in CAA play to finish in last place.

Schedule

Source: Schedule

Game summaries

at Duquesne

at Colgate

Rhode Island

Central Conn St

at Old Dominion

at James Madison

at Delaware

Towson

at Richmond

Maine

New Hampshire

at Stony Brook

References

Albany
Albany Great Danes football seasons
Albany Great Danes football